Alcorn County is a county located in the northeastern portion of the U.S. state of Mississippi. As of the 2020 census, the population was 34,740. Its county seat is Corinth. The county is named in honor of Governor James L. Alcorn.

The Corinth Micropolitan Statistical Area includes all of Alcorn County.

History
Alcorn County was formed in 1870 from portions of Tippah and Tishomingo counties.  It was the site of the Siege of Corinth, an early campaign in the American Civil War.

Geography
It is the smallest county by area in Mississippi. The Tuscumbia and Hatchie rivers intersect the county.

Major highways
  U.S. Route 45
  U.S. Route 72
  Mississippi Highway 2

Adjacent counties
 McNairy County, Tennessee (north)
 Hardin County, Tennessee (northeast)
 Tishomingo County (east)
 Prentiss County (south)
 Tippah County (west)
 Hardeman County, Tennessee (northwest)

National protected area
 Shiloh National Military Park (part)

Demographics

2020 census

As of the 2020 United States Census, there were 34,740 people, 14,649 households, and 9,590 families residing in the county.

2000 census
As of the census of 2000, there were 34,558 people, 14,224 households, and 9,914 families residing in the county.  The population density was 86 people per square mile (33/km2).  There were 15,818 housing units at an average density of 40 per square mile (15/km2).  The racial makeup of the county was 87.37% White, 11.07% Black or African American, 0.10% Native American, 0.21% Asian, 0.06% Pacific Islander, 0.59% from other races, and 0.60% from two or more races.  1.28% of the population were Hispanic or Latino of any race.

There were 14,224 households, out of which 30.90% had children under the age of 18 living with them, 54.50% were married couples living together, 11.50% had a female householder with no husband present, and 30.30% were non-families. 27.60% of all households were made up of individuals, and 11.90% had someone living alone who was 65 years of age or older.  The average household size was 2.39 and the average family size was 2.91.

In the county, the population was spread out, with 23.90% under the age of 18, 9.10% from 18 to 24, 27.90% from 25 to 44, 24.40% from 45 to 64, and 14.80% who were 65 years of age or older.  The median age was 38 years. For every 100 females there were 93.90 males.  For every 100 females age 18 and over, there were 89.60 males.

The median income for a household in the county was $29,041, and the median income for a family was $36,899. Males had a median income of $29,752 versus $20,583 for females. The per capita income for the county was $15,418.  About 13.10% of families and 16.60% of the population were below the poverty line, including 18.60% of those under age 18 and 22.60% of those age 65 or over.

Politics

Lester Carpenter, member of the Mississippi House of Representatives representing the First District of Mississippi, which includes part of Alcorn and Tishomingo counties.
Nick Bain represents the 2nd House District which is exclusively in Alcorn County.

Communities

City
 Corinth (county seat and largest municipality)

Towns
 Farmington
 Glen
 Rienzi

Village
 Kossuth

Census-designated places
 Biggersville
 Jacinto

Unincorporated places
 Hinkle
 Kendrick
 Theo
 Wenasoga

Ghost towns
 Boneyard
 Danville

See also
 Dry counties
 National Register of Historic Places listings in Alcorn County, Mississippi

References

 
Mississippi counties
Populated places established in 1870
Counties of Appalachia
1870 establishments in Mississippi